Enteucha gilvafascia is a moth of the family Nepticulidae. It is found in coastal southern Florida, United States.

The wingspan is 3.1-3.7 mm. Adults have been collected from April to late June and again from early October to early January. There seem to be two generations per year.

The larvae feed on Coccoloba uvifera (seagrape). They mine the leaves of their host plant. The mine is extremely long and narrow. The mines mostly occur near the margin of the leaf and only occasionally cross the main midrib.

External links
New Leaf-Mining Moths of the Family Nepticulidae from Florida

Nepticulidae
Moths of North America